Italy competed at the 1973 Summer Universiade in Moscow, Soviet Union and won 8 medals.

Medals

Details

References

External links
 Universiade (World University Games)
 WORLD STUDENT GAMES (UNIVERSIADE - MEN)
 WORLD STUDENT GAMES (UNIVERSIADE - WOMEN)

1973
1973 in Italian sport
Italy